First Creek may refer to:

First Creek (Adelaide), a tributary of the River Torrens in the eastern suburbs of Adelaide, South Australia 
First Creek (Gasconade River), a stream in Missouri
First Creek (Second Creek), a stream in Missouri
First Creek (St. Francis River), a stream in Missouri
First Creek (Pocatalico River), a stream in West Virginia